Pellett is a surname. Notable people with the surname include:

Wendell Pellett (1917–1996), American politician
William Pellett (1809–?), English cricketer